Gladiolus alatus  is a species of Gladiolus found from southern Namaqualand south to the Cape Peninsula and east to Caledon and Bredasdorp, South Africa. It is found growing on slopes with sandstone and granitic soils.

Description
The flowers bloom from August to October and are sweetly scented.

References

External links
 

alatus